Quick Creek is a stream in southwest Montgomery County in the U.S. state of Missouri. It is a tributary of the Missouri River.

The stream flows south and east to enter the Missouri River floodplain about one mile west of Rhineland.

Quick Creek has the name of Alexander Quick, a pioneer settler.

See also
List of rivers of Missouri

References

Rivers of Montgomery County, Missouri
Rivers of Missouri